Simone Scatizzi (26 May 1931 – 27 August 2010) was the Roman Catholic bishop of the Roman Catholic Diocese of Pistoia, Italy.

Ordained in 1954, Scatizzi was appointed bishop of the Roman Catholic Diocese of Fiesole, Italy and then in 1981, Bishop of the Pistola Diocese retiring in 2006.

Notes

Bishops in Tuscany
1931 births
2010 deaths